Liocoris tripustulatus or the common nettle bug is a species of plant bug belonging to the family Miridae, subfamily Mirinae. The species was first described by Johan Christian Fabricius in 1781.

Distribution
This species can be found in most of Europe.

Habitat
These plant bugs are generally found on low vegetation.

Description

Adults are normally 4 to 5 mm long, darker brown with cream-coloured to yellow highlights. The scutellum shows a heart shaped marking, while in the wings there are two spots. Across the body is present a more or less visible clear band. This species is quite variable in colour. In springs the basic colour is darker, while the cuneus is bright orange-yellow. The new generation of adults is commonly paler and markings are less pronounced. Head width is about 1/2 of the width of the pronotum. Legs are pale yellowish, striped with black rings. Tibiae show short dark spines.

Biology
Adults can be found all year. Following mating, females may survive until mid-summer, when the adults of the new generation appear. The primary food of these bugs in all stages of development is nettles.

Bibliography
Hudec K., Kolibáč J., Laštůvka Z., Peňáz M. a kol. (2007): Příroda České republiky: průvodce faunou, Academia
Kerzhner I. M.; Josifov M. (1999). "Family Miridae". In Aukema, Berend; Rieger, Christian. Catalogue of the Heteroptera of the Palaearctic Region. 3, Cimicomorpha II. Amsterdam: Netherlands Entomological Society. pp. 1–577, pages 108 & 109. .
Kment P. (2013) - Preliminary check-list of the Heteroptera of Czech Republic
Schwartz, Michael D. & Foottit, Robert G. (1998). Revision of the Nearctic species of the genus Lygus Hahn, with a review of the Palearctic species (Heteroptera: Miridae). Memoirs of Entomology International number 10. Gainesville, Florida: Associated Publishers. .

References

External links

Biodiversidad Virtual
Nature Spot

Insects described in 1781
Mirini